Michael Youssef (born September 25, 1948) is an Egyptian-American pastor. He is the senior pastor of the Church of the Apostles in Atlanta, Georgia, and the executive president of Leading the Way.

Life and career
Youssef was born in Egypt, where he became a Christian, and lived in Lebanon and Australia before moving to the United States. While in Australia, Youssef studied at Moore Theological College in Sydney, was ordained as a minister, and met his wife, Elizabeth.

The Youssefs immigrated to the United States in 1977, and in 1984 Youssef became a U.S. citizen. He earned additional degrees from Fuller Theological Seminary in California and Emory University in Georgia.

Youssef worked for nearly 10 years with the Haggai Institute, traveling around the world and teaching courses in evangelism and church leadership to church leaders. He founded the Church of the Apostles in 1987. He has authored more than 35 books, including The Barbarians Are Here, End Times and the Secret of the Mahdi, and Jesus, Jihad and Peace.

Youssef founded Leading The Way in 1988, a ministry in Atlanta, Georgia, with a focus on reaching Muslims in the Middle East. He is also the founding pastor of the Church of the Apostles in Atlanta.

Youssef and his wife live in Atlanta and have four grown children and eight grandchildren.

References

External links
 Church of the Apostles official website
 Leading the Way official website

1948 births
Living people
20th-century evangelicals
21st-century evangelicals
Christians from Georgia (U.S. state)
Egyptian emigrants to Australia
Egyptian emigrants to the United States
Emory University alumni
Evangelical pastors
Evangelical writers
Fuller Theological Seminary alumni
Moore Theological College alumni
People with acquired American citizenship